The protected areas of Guinea include national parks, a strict nature reserve, a faunal reserve, and classified forests.

National parks
 Badiar National Park, also a biosphere reserve
 Haut Niger National Park, also a biosphere reserve

Strict nature reserves
 Mount Nimba Strict Nature Reserve, also a biosphere reserve and World Heritage Site

Biosphere reserves
 Ziama Massif Biosphere Reserve

Faunal reserves
 Tristao Faunal Reserve

Classified forests
 Badiar-sud Classified Forest
 Bagata Classified Forest
 Bakoun Classified Forest
 Balayan-Souroumba Classified Forest
 Bambaya Classified Forest
 Bani Classified Forest
 Banie Classified Forest
 Bantarawel Classified Forest
 Baro Classified Forest
 Beauvois Classified Forest
 Bellel Classified Forest
 Binti Classified Forest
 Botokoly Classified Forest
 Boula Classified Forest
 Chutes de Tinkisso Classified Forest
 Colline-Macenta Classified Forest
 Counsignaki Classified Forest
 Damakhania Classified Forest
 Dara-Labe Classified Forest
 Darou-salam Classified Forest
 Diécké Classified Forest
 Diogoure Classified Forest
 Dixinn Classified Forest
 Djimbera (Bantiguel) Classified Forest
 Dokoro Classified Forest
 Fello Digue Classified Forest
 Fello Sounga Classified Forest
 Fello-Selouma Classified Forest
 Fitacouna Classified Forest
 Fougoumba Classified Forest
 Foye-Madinadian Classified Forest
 Galy Classified Forest
 Gambi Classified Forest
 Gangan Classified Forest
 Gban Classified Forest
 Gouba Classified Forest
 Goulgoul-Kankande Classified Forest
 Grandes Chutes Classified Forest
 Gueme Sangan Classified Forest
 Gueroual Classified Forest
 Guirila Classified Forest
 Haute-Komba Classified Forest
 Kabela Classified Forest
 Kakrima Classified Forest
 Kala Classified Forest
 Kaloum Classified Forest
 Kambia Classified Forest
 Khabitaye Classified Forest
 Koni Classified Forest
 Konkoure Fetto Classified Forest
 Kora Classified Forest
 Koumban-Kourou Classified Forest
 Kourani-Oulete- Dienne Classified Forest
 L'Amana Classified Forest
 Laine Classified Forest
 Lefarani Classified Forest
 Loffa Classified Forest
 Mafou Classified Forest
 Makona Classified Forest
 Milo Classified Forest
 Mirire Classified Forest
 Miti Kambadaga Classified Forest
 Mombeya Classified Forest
 Mt. Balan Classified Forest
 Mt. Balandougou Classified Forest
 Mt. Konossou Classified Forest
 Mt. Kouya Classified Forest
 Mt. Loura Classified Forest
 Mt. Tetini Classified Forest
 Mt. Yonon Classified Forest
 N'Dama Classified Forest
 N'Guidou Classified Forest
 Nialama (or Nyalama) Classified Forest
 Sources du Niger Classified Forest
 Nono Classified Forest
 Ouladin Classified Forest
 Paradji Classified Forest
 Pic de Fon Classified Forest
 Pic de Tibe Classified Forest
 Pinselli Classified Forest
 Sala Classified Forest
 Sambalankan Classified Forest
 Selly-Koro Classified Forest
 Sere Classified Forest
 Serima Classified Forest
 Sierra-Fore Classified Forest
 Sincery-Ourssa Classified Forest
 Sobory Classified Forest
 Souarela Classified Forest
 Sources de Kindia Classified Forest
 Souti-Yanfu Classified Forest
 Soyah Classified Forest
 Tafsirla Classified Forest
 Tamba Classified Forest
 Tangama Classified Forest
 Tialakoun Classified Forest
 Tinka Classified Forest
 Tomine Koumba Classified Forest
 Yardo Classified Forest
 Ziama Massif Classified Forest

Ramsar sites - wetlands of international importance
 Bafing-Falémé
 Bafing-Source
 Gambie-Koulountou
 Gambie-Oundou-Liti
 Ile Alcatraz
 Ile Blanche
 Iles Tristao
 Konkouré
 Niger Source
 Niger-Mafou
 Niger-Niandan-Milo
 Niger-Tinkisso
 Rio Kapatchez
 Rio Pongo
 Sankarani-Fié
 Tinkisso
 Mount Nimba

References

 
Guinea
protected areas